Pickaway County is a county in the U.S. state of Ohio. As of the 2020 census, the population was 58,539. Its county seat is Circleville. Its name derives from the Pekowi band of Shawnee Indians, who inhabited the area. (See List of Ohio county name etymologies.)

Pickaway County is part of the Columbus, OH Metropolitan Statistical Area.

History
The future state of Ohio was part of the Northwest Territory, created in 1787. To begin providing local control of this area, several counties were designated, among them Washington (1788) and Wayne (1796) Counties. Portions of these counties were partitioned off to create Ross (1798), Fairfield (1800), and Franklin (1803) Counties. An act of the General Assembly of Ohio (12 January 1810) directed that portions of Fairfield, Franklin, and Ross counties were to be partitioned off to create Pickaway County effective 1 March 1810, with Circleville named as county seat later that year (see History of Circleville).

Geography
The Scioto River flows southward through the center of Pickaway County. Big Darby Creek drains the upper western part of the county, discharging into the Scioto at Circleville, and Deer Creek drains the lower western part of the county, flowing southward into Ross County. The county terrain consists of low rolling hills carved with drainages; all available areas (87%) are devoted to agriculture. The terrain's highest point (1,090' or 332 m ASL) lies on the county's east border, 2.4 miles (3.9 km) east-northeast of Hargus Lake.

Adjacent counties

 Franklin County - north
 Fairfield County - east
 Hocking County - southeast
 Ross County - south
 Fayette County - southwest
 Madison County - northwest

Main highways

Protected areas
 A. W. Marion State Park
 Deer Creek State Park (part)
 Stage's Pond State Nature Preserve

Lakes
 Deer Creek Lake (part)
 Hargus Lake

Demographics

2010 census
As of the 2010 United States Census, there were 55,698 people, 19,624 households, and 14,286 families in the county. The population density was 111.1/sqmi (42.9/km2)42.4/sqmi (16.4/km2). The racial makeup of the county was 94.5% white, 3.4% black or African American, 0.4% Asian, 0.2% American Indian, 0.3% from other races, and 1.2% from two or more races. Those of Hispanic or Latino origin made up 1.1% of the population. In terms of ancestry, 27.0% were German, 16.3% were American, 14.9% were Irish, and 11.1% were English.

Of the 19,624 households, 35.4% had children under the age of 18 living with them, 56.6% were married couples living together, 10.9% had a female householder with no husband present, 27.2% were non-families, and 22.2% of all households were made up of individuals. The average household size was 2.61 and the average family size was 3.03. The median age was 38.5 years.

The median income for a household in the county was $49,262 and the median income for a family was $58,811. Males had a median income of $44,224 versus $35,077 for females. The per capita income for the county was $21,432. About 9.5% of families and 12.4% of the population were below the poverty line, including 19.3% of those under age 18 and 6.8% of those age 65 or over.

2000 census
As of the 2000 United States Census, there were 52,727 people, 17,599 households, and 13,287 families in the county. The population density was 105.2/sqmi (40.6/km2). There were 18,596 housing units at an average density of 37.1/sqmi (14.3/km2). The racial makeup of the county was 91.95% White, 6.43% Black or African American, 0.28% Native American, 0.22% Asian, 0.03% Pacific Islander, 0.15% from other races, and 0.93% from two or more races. 0.63% of the population were Hispanic or Latino of any race.

There were 17,599 households, out of which 35.40% had children under the age of 18 living with them, 61.50% were married couples living together, 9.80% had a female householder with no husband present, and 24.50% were non-families. 20.60% of all households were made up of individuals, and 9.10% had someone living alone who was 65 years of age or older. The average household size was 2.63 and the average family size was 3.02.

The county population contained 24.30% under the age of 18, 9.00% from 18 to 24, 32.60% from 25 to 44, 23.40% from 45 to 64, and 10.80% who were 65 years of age or older. The median age was 36 years. For every 100 females there were 122.20 males. For every 100 females age 18 and over, there were 125.00 males.

The median income for a household in the county was $42,832, and the median income for a family was $49,259. Males had a median income of $36,265 versus $26,086 for females. The per capita income for the county was $17,478. About 7.60% of families and 9.50% of the population were below the poverty line, including 13.40% of those under age 18 and 7.00% of those age 65 or over.

Politics

Prior to 1952, Pickaway County was strongly Democratic in presidential elections, only backing two Republican candidates for president from 1856 to 1948. Starting with the 1952 election, it has become a Republican Party stronghold, with the sole Democrat to win the county in a presidential election since then being Lyndon B. Johnson in 1964 in the midst of his statewide & national landslide victory.

|}

Economy
Manufacturing makes up a significant proportion of area industry and employment; in the 2010 census, 3075 county residents (13.4%) were employed in manufacturing.
Circleville is home to the largest DuPont chemical plant in Ohio. Opened in the 1950s, it produces Mylar and Tedlar plastic films, the latter used extensively in the production of photovoltaic modules.

Other manufacturing concerns in Circleville or surrounding Pickaway County include Aleris, a producer of rolled and extruded aluminum products, and Florida Production Engineering (FPE), producing plastic injection molded components for the automotive industry. Georgia-Pacific, a manufacturer of paperboard containers and other paper products, has a plant located south of Circleville. The PPG Industries Circleville plant is the company's center for polymer resin production, primarily for automotive applications.

Other major employers include Berger Health System; Circleville City, Teays Valley Local and Logan Elm Local School districts; Circle Plastics/TriMold LLC; the State of Ohio; and Wal-Mart Stores.

Businesses that formerly operated include the Jefferson-Smurfit paper mill, a 300-acre site, that is being redeveloped. American Electric Power (AEP) owned the Picway Power Plant in the northern part of Pickaway County. The coal-fired power plant operated from 1926 to 2015. A GE Lighting plant opened in 1948. The plant closed in 2017. RCA/Thomson Glass operated from 1970 until its closing around 2006.

Government

Education

Teays Valley Local School District
Teays Valley is in the northern part of the county. Schools in this district include:
 Teays Valley High School - 1,262 students
 Teays Valley East Middle School (grades 6–8) - 523
 Teays Valley West Middle School (grades 6–8) - 534
 Ashville Elementary (grades PK-5) - 464
 Walnut Elementary (grades PK-5) - 507
 Scioto Elementary (grades PK-5) - 626
 South Bloomfield Elementary (grades PK-5) - 458
Teays Valley has the largest number of students in the county at 4,374 total students.

Circleville City Schools
 Circleville High School - 559 students
 Circleville Middle School (grades 6–8) - 487
 Circleville Elementary (grades K-5) - 1,029

Logan Elm Local Schools
Logan Elm consists of the area in Southeastern Pickaway County.
 Logan Elm High School - 559 students
 George McDowell-Exchange Middle School (grades 7–8) - 299
 Salt Creek Intermediate School (grades 5–6) - 262
 Washington Elementary (grades K-4) - 212
 Pickaway Elementary (grades K-4) - 188

Westfall Local Schools
Westfall lies in the Western part of the county.
 Westfall High School - 422 students
 Westfall Middle School (grades 6–8) - 335
 Westfall Elementary (grades K-5) - 588

Pickaway-Ross Career & Technology Center
Pickaway-Ross lies just below the county line in Ross County. Students from the following affiliated Pickaway and Ross county districts attend the vocational school:
 Circleville City School District (Pickaway County)
 Logan Elm Local School District (Pickaway County)
 Westfall Local School District (Pickaway County)
 Adena Local School District (Ross County)
 Chillicothe City School District (Ross County)
 Huntington Local School District (Ross County)
 Paint Valley Local School District (Ross County)
 Southeastern Local School District (Ross County)
 Unioto Local School District (Ross County)
 Zane Trace Local School District (Ross County)

Communities

City
 Circleville (county seat)

Villages

 Ashville
 Commercial Point
 Darbyville
 Lockbourne
 Harrisburg
 New Holland
 Orient (disincorporated 2013)
 South Bloomfield
 Tarlton
 Williamsport

Census-designated places
 Derby
 Logan Elm Village
 Orient

Unincorporated communities

 Atlanta
 Duvall
 East Ringgold
 Elmwood
 Era
 Five Points
 Fox
 Grange Hall
 Hayesville
 Kinderhook
 Leistville
 Little Chicago
 Little Walnut
 Matville
 Meade
 Millport
 Pherson
 Robtown
 Saint Paul
 Southern Point
 Stringtown
 Thacher
 Walnut
 Westfall
 Whisler
 Woodlyn

Townships

 Circleville
 Darby
 Deer Creek
 Harrison
 Jackson
 Madison
 Monroe
 Muhlenberg
 Perry
 Pickaway
 Salt Creek
 Scioto
 Walnut
 Washington
 Wayne
 Yamarick ("paper" township coextensive with the city of Circleville)

Notable residents
 Dorothy Adkins (1912–1975), psychologist, grew up in Atlanta, Pickaway County
 Dwight Radcliff, the longest serving Sheriff of Pickaway County

Other notable aspects

Pickaway County is also known for its various places with the name "Hitler", including Hitler Road, Hitler-Ludwig Road, Hitler-Ludwig Cemetery, and Hitler Park. They are not named after the infamous German dictator, but instead after a local historical family named the Hitlers, who have been described by a local paper in 2011 as "fine, upstanding citizens". The family included George Washington Hitler and his son, Dr. Gay Hitler, who worked as a local dentist between 1922 and 1946.

See also
 National Register of Historic Places listings in Pickaway County, Ohio

References

External links
 
 Pickaway Chamber of Commerce and visitor info
 Pickaway County Local Government Links
 Pickaway County Sheriff's Office

 
1810 establishments in Ohio